Marco Angeli di Sartena (1905-1985) was a politician from Corsica, who wrote in the famous Literary Review "A Muvra". He was an active irredentist, supporting the union of Corsica to Italy.

Life

He was born in Sartena, from a noble Corsican family with roots in the Republic of Genoa. After moving to Italy because of his irredentism ideals, he graduated in medicine at the University of Pisa.

The irredentist Marco Angeli di Sartèna wrote in 1924 the first book in "Corso" (titled Terra còrsa) and many lyrics in this dialect/language (titled Malincunie) in Ajaccio. He even created and wrote the newspaper «Gioventù» of the "Partito Corso d'azione", partially in Italian and Corsican.

In 1930 Marco Angeli created the "Gruppi d'Azione Corsa", that did a huge propaganda in Italy and Corsica against France's control of the island: already in 1931 it had more than one thousand members. He had friendship with Pietro Rocca and influenced him to become an irredentist.

In spring 1943 Angeli returned with Petru Giovacchini to his Corsica -occupied by Italian troops in November 1942- in order to try to promote an administrative union of the island to the Kingdom of Italy (like Dalmatia): but he was unsuccessful because of Nazi German opposition.

After the Italian defeat in World War II Angeli was condemned to death by a French tribunal, but he escaped the punishment by remaining in Italy for the rest of his life.

Bibliography
 Rainero, R.H. Mussolini e Pétain. Storia dei rapporti tra l’Italia e la Francia di Vichy. Ussme Ed. Roma, 1990

See also
 Italian irredentism in Corsica

References

People from Corse-du-Sud
1905 births
1985 deaths